Hélène is a 1936 French drama film directed by Jean Benoît-Lévy and starring Madeleine Renaud, Jean-Louis Barrault and Constant Rémy. It is based on a novel by Vicki Baum.

The film's sets were designed by the art director Lucien Carré.

Cast
 Madeleine Renaud as Hélène Wilfur  
 Jean-Louis Barrault as Pierre Régnier  
 Constant Rémy as Le professeur Amboise 
 Héléna Manson as Valérie 
 Odette Joyeux as Françoise  
 Robert Le Vigan as Le docteur Régnier  
 Georges Bever as Le garçon de laboratoire  
 Jeanne Helbling as Yvonne Amboise  
 Blanche Peyrens as La doctoresse  
 Greta Buelens as Totoche  
 Marguerite Daulboys as La veuve  
 René Dary as Marcel  
 Maurice Baquet as Durant Tout Court  
 Paul Escoffier as Le juge  
 Armand Lurville as Le doyen  
 Tsugundo Maki as L'étudiant japonais 
 Roger Toziny as Le libraire  
 Juozas Miltinis as Le Russe 
 Gaby André 
 Gilberte Géniat 
 Pierre-Louis
 Pierre Sarda

References

Bibliography 
 Andrews, Dudley. Mists of Regret: Culture and Sensibility in Classic French Film. Princeton University Press, 1995.

External links 
 

1936 films
French drama films
1936 drama films
1930s French-language films
Films directed by Jean Benoît-Lévy
Films based on Austrian novels
Remakes of German films
French black-and-white films
1930s French films